6 Songs for Bruce, also commonly known as the 4-Track Demo, is an early single-sided demo cassette tape by American rock band Soundgarden.

Overview
The band, at the time a three-piece named Sound Garden, composed of guitarist Kim Thayil, bassist Hiro Yamamoto, and Chris Cornell on drums and vocals, recorded the demo, in Jack Endino's basement four-track studio on April 24, 1985, for their friend Bruce Pavitt, hence the name of the tape, which features a rare early version of "Tears to Forget" sung by Yamamoto, and, as a bonus song, a Cornell's solo recording titled "The Storm". The side B of the cassette, humorously titled Zen Deity Speaks, contains no recordings.

The demo tape was among many of the artifacts displayed at the Museum of Pop Culture's Nirvana: Taking Punk to the Masses exhibit in Seattle, Washington.

6 Songs for Bruce would be the second demo of Soundgarden; which was preceded by a tape titled The First 15, recorded in 1984.

Reissues and re-recordings
"Tears to Forget" would be re-recorded in late 1985, with Cornell on vocals and Scott Sundquist on drums, for the C/Z Records compilation album Deep Six released in 1986. It was recorded for a third time in 1987, with Matt Cameron on drums, for the band's debut EP Screaming Life.

"The Storm" would be laid down for a second time, during a March 1986 session, on a 16-track demo tape that got shelved. 28 years later, again with Endino as producer, the tune would be re-recorded in finished form in May 2014. Retitled as simply "Storm", it was released on the band's rarities box set Echo of Miles: Scattered Tracks Across the Path.

"Incessant Mace" was reissued on the 1986 C/Z Records limited edition cassette-only various artists compilation Pyrrhic Victory. In 1988, the song would be re-recorded, with Cameron on drums, for its release on the band's first full-length album Ultramega OK. In 2017, two previously unreleased eight-track versions of "Incessant Mace", taken from a demo tape, informally called the "Ultramega EP" by the band members, produced in 1987 by Endino and Chris Hanzsek at Seattle's Reciprocal Recording studio, were included on the expanded remixed and remastered reissue of Ultramega OK.

Track listing

Personnel
Sound Garden
 Chris Cornell – lead vocals, drums, all instruments on "The Storm"
 Kim Thayil – guitar
 Hiro Yamamoto – bass, lead vocals on "Tears to Forget"

Production
Jack Endino – production

Notes

References

Demo albums
Soundgarden albums
1985 albums
Albums produced by Jack Endino